Wellington Land District is a land district (cadastral division) of Western Australia, located within the South-West Land Division on the state's west coast. It spans roughly 32°56'S - 33°40'S in latitude and 115°25'E - 116°50'E in longitude.

History
The system of land districts came together in an ad hoc fashion, and the Wellington district started to be subdivided in 1835 well before any thought was given to formally defining its boundaries. The definition later used by the Lands and Surveys department came from an 1862 gazettal which read as follows:

Location and features
The district is located on the Indian Ocean coast, roughly centred on the city of Bunbury and extending north to Yarloop, east to Darkan and south to just past both Capel and Donnybrook.

Towns and areas

Towns
The Wellington district contains the following current or former townsites:

Agricultural areas
Under the Land Act 1898, the Agricultural Lands Purchase Act 1896, and preceding regulations, it was open to the Governor to declare agricultural areas on crown land or repurchased estates on private land, to which special provisions applied for both alienation and improvement. Many of these estates came into being shortly after World War I for the purposes of soldier resettlement.

References

Land districts of Western Australia
South West (Western Australia)